Nanayakkara is a Sinhalese name derived from the Sanskrit language. It may refer to the following people:
 
Surname
Adeesha Nanayakkara (born 1991), Sri Lankan cricketer
Alwis Nanayakkara (born 1992), Sri Lankan cricketer
Chandika Nanayakkara, Sri Lankan actor
Charana Nanayakkara (born 1997), Sri Lankan cricketer
D. R. Nanayakkara (1915–1989), Sri Lankan actor
Hemakumara Nanayakkara, Sri Lankan politician
Ishara Nanayakkara, Sri Lankan entrepreneur and businessman
Kaumal Nanayakkara (born 1999), Sri Lankan cricketer
Manusha Nanayakkara (born 1977), Sri Lankan politician
Nanayakkara Atulugamage Stephen de Silva Jayasinghe (1911-1977), Sri Lankan Sinhala politician
Nethalie Nanayakkara (born 1936), Sri Lankan actress
S. D. F. C. Nanayakkara, 34th Surveyor General of Sri Lanka
Suranga Nanayakkara (born 1981), Sri Lankan born computer scientist and Inventor.
Udaya Nanayakkara, Sri Lankan general and military engineer
V. T. Nanayakkara (1902–?), Sri Lankan politician
Vasudeva Nanayakkara (born 1939), Sri Lankan politician
Wally Nanayakkara (1939–2003), Sri Lankan actor
Yasapalitha Nanayakkara (1940–1996), Sri Lankan film director, screenwriter, producer, lyricist and actor

See also

Sinhalese surnames